Gethins is a surname. Notable people with the surname include:

 Conor Gethins (born 1983), Irish footballer 
 Stephen Gethins (born 1976), Scottish politician

See also
 Gethin